Augustin Lanner (23 January 1835 in Vienna – 27 September 1855 in Vienna), sometimes known as August Lanner, was an Austrian composer, the son of the better-known Josef Lanner. He was first educated at the St. Anna-Schule but received no music instruction at that time. His earliest music education was first provided by the k.k Kapellmeister Josef Strebinger in harmony and later took instructions in composition with the Viennese composer Josef Hellmesberger and also Professor Josef Mayseder. Among his first efforts at musical composition is a waltz which did not survive obscurity.

After his father's death in 1843, August conducted his father's orchestra when he was only 8 years old at the 'Bräuhausgarten in Fünfhaus' in front of some 2,000 visitors. Making his debut in 1853, he was destined to live only until he was 20 after suffering from a lung illness. In August Lanner's short-lived career, he composed some 30 dance pieces.

References

External links

A complete list of Augustin Lanner's compositions

1835 births
1855 deaths
Composers from Vienna
Austrian Romantic composers
Deaths from lung disease
Austrian conductors (music)
Male conductors (music)
19th-century classical composers
19th-century conductors (music)
Austrian male classical composers